Henry de Bruno Austin was a Victorian property developer in London, who planned large housing estates in Ealing and Lancaster Gate but went bankrupt before they could be fully realised.  He was a brother-in-law to Charles Dickens and his daughter, Audrey, married a wealthy American horse breeder, Charles Knebelcamp.

References

British real estate businesspeople
19th-century English businesspeople
Businesspeople from London
Year of birth missing
Year of death missing